Gomel State Medical University (Homiel State Medical University, Гомельский государственный медицинский университет; former name: Gomel State Medical Institute) is public teaching university based in Gomel, Belarus.

History 
In 1990 Gomel State Medical University was founded as per resolution of the Council of Ministers and Order of the Minister of Health of the Byelorussian Soviet Socialist Republic.

Education
The main campus of Gomel State Medical University is located in downtown Gomel, with 18 adjacent clinical sites spread across the city. Education at Gomel State Medical University includes five to six-year programs in basic and clinical medical science. Graduates of the University obtain M.D. degree and are required to complete a minimum of a one-year internship in order to practice clinical medicine.  Education of foreign students at Gomel State Medical University started in 2003.

Rectors
 Yury Bandazhevsky (1990-1999)
 Sergei Vladimirovich Zavoronok (1999-2007)
 Anatoly Nikolayevich Lyzikov (2007-current)

References

External links
University website 
Belarus State Department of Health website 

Universities in Belarus
Gomel
Buildings and structures in Gomel Region
Educational institutions established in 1990
1990 establishments in Belarus
Medical schools in Belarus